General Alvear Partido is a partido (administrative subdivision) in Buenos Aires Province in Argentina.

The partido and capital are named after the 19th-century Argentinian soldier and statesman Carlos María de Alvear.

Towns
 General Alvear (capital)
 El Chumbeao
 El Parche
 El Tabaré
 Emma
 Los Gatos
 Jose Maria Micheo
 Santa Isabel
 Lafuente

External links

 

Populated places established in 1869
Partidos of Buenos Aires Province
1869 establishments in Argentina